Mastic may refer to:

Adhesives and pastes
Mastic (plant resin)
Mastic asphalt, or asphalt, is a sticky, black and highly viscous  liquid
Mastic cold porcelain, or salt ceramic, is a traditional salt-based modeling clay.
Mastic, high-grade construction adhesive commonly used to bond ceiling, wall, and floor tiles, plywood panels, concrete, asphalt, leather and fabric.
Mastic, waterproof, putty-like paste used in building as a joint-sealer or filler
Stone mastic asphalt, deformation resistant, durable surfacing material

Liqueurs
Mastika, a liqueur with added mastic aroma
Chios Mastiha, a liqueur flavoured with mastic distillate or mastic oil from the island of Chios

Places
Mastic, New York, hamlet in Suffolk County, New York, USA
Mastic Beach, New York, USA
Mastic Reserve, Cayman Islands
Mastic–Shirley (LIRR station), Shirley, New York, USA

Plants
Mastic tree (disambiguation)

Other
Mastic Brandy

See also
Donald Mastick
Seabury C. Mastick (1871–1969), New York politician